Saint-François, Quebec may refer to:
 Saint-François, Laval, Quebec, a district of Laval, Quebec that was an independent city before 1965
 Saint-François-de-l'Île-d'Orléans, known simply as Saint-François until December 2003
 Saint-François-de-Beauce, Quebec, now part of Beauceville, Quebec
 Saint-François-du-Lac, Quebec
 Saint-François-de-Sales, Quebec in Saguenay–Lac-Saint-Jean region
(confusingly, some of the other Saint-François were also known historically as Saint-François-de-Sales parishes)
 Saint-François-de-la-Rivière-du-Sud, Quebec
 Saint-François-d'Assise, Quebec
 Saint-François-Xavier-de-Brompton, Quebec
 Saint-François-Xavier-de-Viger, Quebec